Elisa (born April 14, 1989) is a female Japanese singer from Kanagawa Prefecture. She was signed to Sacra Music until 2021 when her contract expired.

Biography

Music career

In 2007, Elisa was chosen from a contest of 3,000 participants at Elite Model Look to become a professional model. In the same year, she also signed a contract with Geneon Universal as a singer. In October 2007, she debuted with her single "Euphoric Field", which was used as the opening theme song for the anime series Ef: A Tale of Memories.

In 2011, it was announced by her agency that she would be putting her career on hold due to fatigue. Her concert that was scheduled for October 2 of that year at the Tokyo Globe-za theater, as well as all other scheduled concerts and events were cancelled, and her Twitter page was deleted. Despite her hiatus, she released a "best-of" album on June 20, 2012.

In January 2013, Elisa announced that she would resume her singing career under her new label, SME Records. She also opened a new Twitter account. She also released a new single, titled "Shout my Heart", which was bundled with the 12th volume of LisAni magazine.

In April 2014, Elisa made her U.S. performance debut in Seattle, Washington at Sakura-Con. She released the single "Millenario" on April 30, 2014; the title track is used as the first ending theme to the 2014 anime television series The Irregular at Magic High School. She released the single "Eonian" on November 12, 2014; the title track is used as the theme song to the 2014 animated film Expelled from Paradise.

Elisa released the single "Rain or Shine" on August 31, 2016; the title track is used as the ending theme to the 2016 anime television series 91 Days She released two albums in 2016: Anichro, released on March 23, and Genetica, released on November 30. Elisa moved to the Sacra Music record label under Sony Music Entertainment Japan in April 2017.
She released her latest song in 2020, Hikari no Hoshi.

In September 2020, Elisa allegedly suffered sexual harassment from her manager. She has terminated her contract with Smile Company.

Discography

Albums

Maxi singles

Live performances
Animax Musix Spring 2010 (May 15, 2010)
Elisa First Live: Feel the Pulsation (March 28, 2009)
Animelo Summer Live 2008 (August 31, 2008)
Animelo Summer Live 2009 (August 22, 2009)
Animelo Summer Live 2010 (August 28, 2010)
Animelo Summer Live 2011 (August 27, 2011)
Anime Festival Asia 2013 (November 11, 2013)
Sakura-Con 2014 (April 19, 2014)
Animax Carnival Malaysia 2015 (March 28, 2015)
AnimeNEXT 2015 (June 14, 2015)
Animax Carnival Philippines 2016 (October 15, 2016)
Anime Expo Lite x LisAni! 2020 (July 4, 2020)

References

External links
 
SME Records profile 

1989 births
Living people
Models from Kanagawa Prefecture
Japanese female models
Japanese women rock singers
Japanese women pop singers
Anime singers
Musicians from Kanagawa Prefecture
NBCUniversal Entertainment Japan artists
Sacra Music artists
Sony Music Entertainment Japan artists
21st-century Japanese singers
21st-century Japanese women singers